David Hill, Jr. (born July 28, 1977) is a former American football Wide Receiver/Linebacker for the Detroit Fury and the Austin Wranglers in the Arena Football League. Hill previously coached at Florida A & M University where he developed two NFL Wide Receivers. Hill is now the Wide Receivers Coach at Holmes Community College. While at Holmes, Hill developed All-American and New York Jets Wide Receiver Jonathan Rumph.

In May 2011, he was inducted into the Alabama Sports Hall of Fame. He was also a four sport athlete. He appeared on the first ever Arena Football 2006 video game by EA Sports.

EUFAULA HIGH SCHOOL (AL) UNDER HEAD COACH RUSH PROPST
	Blue Chip All-American
       5A Player of the Year in Alabama
	5A Offensive Player of the Year in Alabama
	#1 ranked receiver in the state of Alabama
	#3 ranked receiver in the country by Southeast Sports
	Pepsi "Player of the Year"
	Coca-Cola "Player of the Year"
	Super 12
	Alabama vs. Mississippi All-Star Game
       Super All-State
       All-American
       Gatorade "Player of the Year"
       SuperPrep "Top 50 in Dixie"
       Birmingham Post-Herald "10 Most Wanted" List
       Birmingham "Super Senior"
       Mr. Alabama Runner-Up
       4A-6A “Player of the Year”

1977 births
Living people
People from Eufaula, Alabama
American football wide receivers
American football linebackers
Auburn Tigers football players
Troy Trojans football players
Carolina Rhinos players
Mobile Wizards players
Greensboro Prowlers players
Detroit Fury players
Austin Wranglers players
Florida A&M Rattlers football coaches